is a tube shooter video game originally developed by Llamasoft and published by Atari Corporation for the Atari Jaguar in North America on 13 April, 1994. It was released in Europe on 27 June and in Japan on 15 December of the same year, with the Japanese release being published by Mumin Corporation. Part of Atari Corp.'s 2000 series, it is a remake by Jeff Minter of Dave Theurer's 1981 arcade game Tempest, which used Atari's QuadraScan vector color display technology.

Taking control of the claw-shaped Blaster spacecraft from the original game, the player has to survive and travel across multiple levels until the end of an intergalactic war, battling against a variety of enemies that appear on the playfield. Originally an exclusive for the Jaguar, Tempest 2000 was ported to MS-DOS, Macintosh, Sega Saturn, PlayStation and Windows, each with several changes and additions from the original version.

Tempest 2000 was critically acclaimed when it was released on the Jaguar, with critics praising the graphics, gameplay and soundtrack. It has often been called one of the best games released for the Jaguar and as of 1 April 1995, the Jaguar version has sold more than 30,000 copies during its lifetime, making it one of the best-selling games for the system. Critical reception to the various ports, though still mostly positive, was more mixed than reception for the original version, owing to the aging of the game and differing opinions of the enhancements the ports offered.

Gameplay 

Tempest 2000 modifies the gameplay of the original Tempest by adding power-ups, bonus levels, more sophisticated enemy types and wildly varying web level designs. The game features a total of 100 web levels, with new frame colors and variations after every 16 levels completed. In all versions, progress is automatically saved after completing a couple of levels and players are allowed to resume by using "Keys" to return into the last stage the game saved at. There are also three gameplay modes in addition to the main game. Completing all 100 web levels in Tempest 2000 unlocks "Beastly Mode", which is a harder difficulty setting where enemies move faster, fire more often and are more resilient to the player's shots; in addition, the player's ship fires at a lower rate than in the original difficulty.

The main objective of the game is to survive and score many points as long as possible by clearing the playfield on the screen from enemies that appear at the bottom of the web. The player's ship has rapid-fire capacity to shoot down enemies fast within the same segment the player is positioned at. The ship is also equipped with a Superzapper smart bomb that destroys all current enemies on the playfield, while recharging the Superzapper and using it a second time destroys a random enemy on-screen.

New to Tempest 2000 are power-ups, which appear as capsule-shaped polygon objects after destroying a number of enemies or enemy bullets. Catching the power-up will activate one of a number of progressively more useful capabilities such as the Particle Laser, which enhances the ship's firepower and allows much faster destruction of enemies and spikes left by Spike Layers. Jump allows the player to jump off the web to avoid enemy fire and enemies that travel along the edge of the playfield such as the Fuseball and electrified attacks from the Pulsars. The A.I. Droid is an autonomous vectorial ship that appears floating above the web and shoots at the enemies; in addition, grabbing a power-up while warping into a new level will play an increasingly high-pitched sound of a woman screaming "Yes! Yes! Yes!" and after arriving into the next level, the first power-up that the player will receive is the A.I. Droid.

Also new to the game are Warp Bonus tokens, which allow the player access into any of the three types of bonus stages after collecting three tokens and completing the level. Completing the bonus level grants 25,000 points and the player skips five levels ahead, but failing will warp the player to just one level. Outta Here! is a power-up that appears randomly and collecting it will destroy all enemies on-screen and warps the player into the next level, however, spikes left by Spike Layers will not be eliminated, so it is possible to lose a life by hitting one as the ship warps down the web. Between certain power-ups, players can also gain 2000 point bonuses as well.

Other modes include Traditional Tempest, which is a recreation of the original arcade game; Tempest Plus, which is a mix between Traditional and Tempest 2000 modes and Tempest Duel, a two-player versus mode where players compete in a series of matches against each other; in addition, this mode includes an exclusive Mirror power-up, which deflects shots from the rival back at him, alongside other objects to use in the playfield and regular enemies from the main game.

Development 
At a gaming convention, Atari held a conference with prospective developers for the Atari Jaguar at which they listed off arcade games that they were considering having converted to the Jaguar, asking the developers to raise their hands at ones they wanted to work on. Jeff Minter volunteered to do Tempest as it was one of his favorite games. At the launch party for the Jaguar in New York, the creator of the Atari Jaguar took Minter aside and told him that he felt Tempest 2000 was a poor demonstration of the Jaguar's capabilities. Though discouraged, Minter continued to work on the game until it was finished and also regarded the Jaguar hardware as easy to develop for. Tempest 2000 was developed in Wales. Carrie Tahquechi, wife of ex-Atari producer Ted Tahquechi did the female voice work in Tempest 2000.

The most common criticism with the Jaguar version of Tempest 2000 was the lack of a rotary controller similar to the controller on the Tempest arcade machine. In fact, the game was programmed with an option to use just such a controller, despite the fact that Atari never released one. Such a controller was planned for development and release by Atari, but no prototypes exist. However, several homebrew options exist by using parts from a Jaguar controller and either an Atari 2600 Driving Controller or new, higher-precision rotary encoders. The one used by Jeff Minter during testing was made from a hacked-up 2600 driving controller.

Audio 

The original Atari Jaguar version's music was created by Ian Howe, Alastair Lindsay and Kevin Saville of Imagitec Design (a.k.a. Dream Weavers), who also created the music for Jeff Minter's Defender 2000 on the Jaguar as well.

The music was composed in the Commodore Amiga MOD file format, although non-Jaguar releases of the game played music from a CD. At the time of its release, the music soundtrack could also be purchased on CD directly from Atari. The CD was also bundled with the short-lived Atari Jaguar CD to demonstrate the system's Virtual Light Machine music visualizer. It became the basis for the audio for all conversions of the game to come including the PC, PlayStation and Saturn versions. Several tracks, however, were not used in the Jaguar version due to cartridge space constraints.

Release 
Tempest 2000 was originally released for the Atari Jaguar in 1994 in all regions including Japan, where it came with an exclusive Japanese manual for the region. The game was ported to MS-DOS, Macintosh, Sega Saturn and PlayStation, the latter version with several changes to the design under the name of Tempest X3. The Jaguar version was included as part of the Atari 50: The Anniversary Celebration compilation for Nintendo Switch, PlayStation 4, Steam, and Xbox One, marking the game's first re-release.

PCs 
The MS-DOS version, programmed by Imagitec Design, contains optional AdLib and Roland MT-32 versions of the music, but lacks several of the visual effects of the console versions, such as the "Melt-O-Vision" transition effects. The Windows version is rendered in higher resolution, and has some unique glitches, like registering bonus level scores incorrectly. The Macintosh version was developed and published by Logicware in 1998.

Tempest X3 
Tempest X3, the Sony PlayStation version, was released in 1996, with updated graphics and sound, although the following gameplay differences from the original version were identified by Jeff Minter in a Usenet post:
 The "AI Droid" only follows the player, instead of acting autonomously. A new, "Mega Droid" powerup rectifies this somewhat, but it takes a very long time within a level to acquire it.
 Pulsars now move slowly around the top of the Web if they reach it (rather than electrifying the whole top edge the moment they arrive).
 The Particle Laser is no more effective than the normal laser against Spikes (in the original, it destroys them very quickly).
 Some of the harder, "sticking point" webs have been removed from the game entirely.

Entering the name "YIFF!" or "H_V_S" on the top highscore position activates a secret mode, allowing the user to choose to play the original Tempest 2000 game. Any high scores made in this mode are not saved, the music (wave-captured from the original modules) is muffled and the effectiveness of the Particle Laser against spikes is not restored.

The PlayStation version of Tempest X3 supports the PlayStation Mouse, Nyko Trackball and Namco's rotary neGcon analog controller.

Saturn 
The Saturn version, programmed by High Voltage Software, is close to the original Jaguar version, except for the removal of the third type of bonus level. It uses most of the audio tracks from the Tempest 2000 soundtrack CD for gameplay. The speech samples were redone.

Reception 

Tempest 2000 received general critical acclaim when released for the Jaguar. GamePro praised the graphics and high speed, said the music included "the best techno-rave tracks anywhere", and deemed the two-player competitive mode "well worth the price of the cart." Electronic Gaming Monthly gave it their "Game of the Month" award, citing the "superb" techno soundtrack and "graphics that surpass the arcade version". GameFan also gave the Jaguar version a positive review. In a 1995 overview of Atari's history, Next Generation said of Tempest 2000 that "This single game probably did more for Atari's reputation than anything the company's marketing team had managed in the last five years." Tempest 2000 sold more than 30,000 copies, making it the second best-selling game on the platform behind Alien vs Predator, though it is unknown how many were sold in total during its lifetime as of 1 April 1995. 

The PlayStation version was much less well received. Jeff Gerstmann of GameSpot and Scary Larry of GamePro both said that it offers too few enhancements or additions over the by-then more than two years old Jaguar version. Dan Hsu and Crispin Boyer of Electronic Gaming Monthly questioned why the Jaguar game had received such acclaim in the first place, opining that it was simply an outdated arcade game with some extra "glitter" which has no bearing on the essence of the game, and that the PlayStation version was essentially the same. Sushi-X felt that it paled against the Jaguar version, lacking the smoothness of the original release. Gerstmann, Hsu, Boyer, and Sushi-X all also complained that the game suffers from poor control in the absence of a rotary controller like the original Tempests. However, a Next Generation critic gave it a positive review, opining that it retained the elements that made the Jaguar version great and that the enhancements were strong enough to make it fresh.

Reviewing the Saturn version, Paul Glancey of Sega Saturn Magazine recalled the impact of the game's original release on the Jaguar: "... Jeff Minter had pepped up the gameplay with a barrage of eye-warping pixel explosions, swirling, smearing colour effects and a 'banging' ravey soundtrack. ... Turn down the lights, turn up the colour, run the sound through your hi-fi then jam up the bass and the volume and you could enjoy a gaming experience so hypnotic as to be almost mind-altering." He concluded that the Saturn port, though slightly inferior to the Jaguar original, effectively recreated this experience for Saturn owners.

Entertainment Weekly gave the game an A- and wrote that "An update of the arcade shooting classic, Tempest 2000 is multimedia in the truest sense, with psychedelic graphics, a CD-quality soundtrack, breathy voice samples (the words superzapper recharge have never sounded more erotic), even text that scrolls past at dizzying speeds. The one weakness is the often-unresponsive Jaguar control pad."

In 1996, GamesMaster ranked the game 17th on their "Top 100 Games of All Time." Tempest 2000 was also awarded Best Jaguar Game of 1994 by Electronic Gaming Monthly.

Legacy 
In 1996, the game's Melt-O-Vision trademark was abandoned, while the trademark renewal for the title was also cancelled in 2006. It was cited by Ultra/United Games as an influence during development of Battle-Girl. VM Labs licensed Tempest for their Nuon DVD system and hired Jeff Minter to produce a sequel, Tempest 3000. Minter also produced the unofficial "inspired by" follow-ups Space Giraffe and TxK on the Sony PlayStation Vita. On 24 August 2008, the source code of Tempest 2000 was released by the defunct Jaguar Sector II website under a CD compilation for PC titled Jaguar Source Code Collection. Also, two unofficial clones of Tempest 2000 named Typhoon 2001 and Cyclone 2000 were launched for PC and Android devices, by Thorsten Kuphaldt and NoCrew Mobile respectively. Another sequel, Tempest 4000, was released in July 2018. The title was a reworking of an earlier clone by Minter titled TxK, which incorporates classic Tempest 2000 music and enemies, alongside other enhancements.

Notes

References

External links 
 Tempest 2000 at AtariAge
 Tempest 2000 at GameFAQs
 Tempest 2000 at MobyGames

1994 video games
Atari games
Atari Jaguar games
Commercial video games with freely available source code
DOS games
Fixed shooters
High Voltage Software games
Imagitec Design games
Llamasoft games
Classic Mac OS games
Multiplayer and single-player video games
PlayStation (console) games
Sega Saturn games
Trackball video games
Video game remakes
Video games developed in the United Kingdom
Video games scored by Alastair Lindsay
Video games scored by Ian Howe
Video games scored by Kevin Saville
Windows games